Turf  may refer to:

General
 Grass, either natural or artificial, including:
 Sod, the surface layer of ground consisting of a mat of grass and grass roots, sometimes used as a construction material
 Lawn, an area of grass maintained for decorative or recreational use
 Peat, used for fuel

Sports
 Sports turf, grass surface for race tracks and athletic fields
 Golf course turf and other manicured sporting greens
 Horse racing, a colloquialism, but also a race held on a track surfaced with sports turf
 Turf Club (disambiguation), various racing institutions

Places
 Turf Hotel, a public house at the Racecourse Ground in Wrexham, Wales
 Turf Moor, a football stadium in Burnley, Lancashire, England
 Turf Paradise Race Course, in Phoenix, Arizona, US
 Turf Tavern, a public house in Oxford, England

Other uses  

 Turf (video game), a location based real-time game for smartphones
 TURF analysis (total unduplicated reach and frequency), a statistical method
 Turf (Image Comics), a comic book from Image Comics written by Jonathan Ross, with art by Tommy Lee Edwards
 Turf (cigarette), a 1950s East German brand
 "Turf", a storyline in Batman: Legends of the Dark Knight

See also.  

 TERF, the acronym for trans-exclusionary radical feminist